The Apogoninae are the most species-rich and, of its shape, size, color and habitat, most diverse subfamily of cardinalfishes (Apogonidae). It can be found in coastal tropical and subtropical regions of the Indian Ocean, the eastern Pacific and the Atlantic, down to depths of 300 meters.

Genera
The following genera are included in the subfamily:

 Amioides H.M. Smith & Radcliffe, 1912
 Apogon Lacépède, 1801
 Apogonichthyoides J.L.B. Smith, 1949
 Apogonichthys Bleeker, 1854
 Archamia T.N. Gill, 1863
 Astrapogon Fowler, 1907
 Cercamia  J. E. Randall & C. L. Smith, 1988
 Cheilodipterus Lacépède, 1801
 Fibramia T. H. Fraser & Mabuchi, 2014 
 Foa  D. S. Jordan & Evermann, 1905
 Fowleria D. S. Jordan & Evermann, 1905
 Glossamia T.N. Gill, 1863
 Holapogon  T. H. Fraser, 1973
 Jaydia J. L. B. Smith, 1961
 Lachneratus T. H. Fraser & Struhsaker, 1991
 Lepidamia T. N. Gill, 1863
 Neamia  H. M. Smith & Radcliffe, 1912
 Nectamia D. S. Jordan, 1917
 Ostorhinchus Lacépède, 1802
 Paroncheilus J. L. B. Smith, 1964
 Phaeoptyx T. H. Fraser & C. R. Robins, 1970
 Pristiapogon Klunzinger, 1870
 Pristicon T. H. Fraser, 1972
 Pterapogon Koumans, 1933
 Rhabdamia M. C. W. Weber, 1909
 Siphamia M. C. W. Weber, 1909
 Sphaeramia Fowler & B. A. Bean, 1930
 Taeniamia T. H. Fraser, 2013
 Verulux T. H. Fraser, 1972
 Vincentia Castelnau, 1872
 Yarica Whitley 1930 
 Zapogon T. H. Fraser, 1972
 Zoramia D. S. Jordan, 1917

References 

 Mabuchi, K., Fraser, T.H., Song, H., Azuma, Y. & Nishida, M. (2014): Revision of the systematics of the cardinalfishes (Percomorpha: Apogonidae) based on molecular analyses and comparative reevaluation of morphological characters. Zootaxa, 3846 (2): 151–203. doi: 10.11646/zootaxa.3846.2.1

 
Apogonidae
Ray-finned fish subfamilies
Taxa named by Albert Günther